Padbury Buildings is the name for a range of existing and former structures found in various localities in Western Australia.
The Padbury family, mainly Walter Padbury, had a range of buildings, some of which now are heritage listed.

Buildings 
In the Perth central business district the Padbury building was on the eastern side of Forrest Place.

In the eastern suburbs of Perth were a number of businesses and buildings in Bassendean, Guildford and Midland; the company that ran the storesPadbury StoresLtd went into liquidation due to the costs of the Forrest Place building.

In Bassendean, Padbury Buildings, also Padbury Store, were on Perth Road (now on Guildford Road) immediately across Guildford Road from the Bassendean railway station.

In East Guildford, Padbury Buildings were on Terrace Road, just east of the Rose and Crown Hotel.  By 1949 the Guildford Padbury building was owned by C & C.

Stores 
The names of buildings and business did not necessarily have Padbury as the part of the name.  The Guildford store is referred to in 1903 and 1908 as the Colonial Stores.

Padbury Stores were also opened in Moora and Toodyay.

Padbury House 
A number of buildings in Perth were named "Padbury House" at different times.

Part of the Saint Charles Seminary in Guildford has been known as Padbury House.

Padbury House was a building in 1929 on the corner of King Street and St Georges Terrace, Perth.

Flour mill 
On the Midland railway line east of Guildford and located in East Guildford, a siding had been in place for William Padbury's Peerless Flour Mill.

Notes

References 

Buildings and structures in Western Australia
East Guildford, Western Australia